Gvar'am is a kibbutz in southern Israel, It is located around 12 kilometres from Ashkelon on the road to Yad Mordechai, it falls under the jurisdiction of Hof Ashkelon Regional Council.

History
Kibbutz Gvar'am was established in 1942 on land owned by Jewish National Fund, which had formerly belonged to the Palestinian village of Simsim.

It has been targeted by Hamas rockets for many years. A rocket killed a resident of the kibbutz, who was the mother-in-law of English actor Paul Kaye (who had lived there for a year and met his wife there), in 2008.

References

External links
Official website 

Kibbutzim
Kibbutz Movement
Populated places established in 1942
Gaza envelope
Populated places in Southern District (Israel)
1942 establishments in Mandatory Palestine